Frank Vinothinan Sebaratnam (born August 19, 1954) is a professional tennis player who has competed at an international level. He is the former No 1 player in Sri Lanka and represented his country at the Davis Cup.

Early career
Frank Sebaratnam was born in Jaffna, Sri Lanka, to Lourdes and Christopher Sebaratnam. Coached by his father, he showed early promise  winning the Singles title at the Juvenile National Tennis Championships at the age of 11.

Professional career
After winning numerous regional competitions, Frank moved to Colombo to further pursue his career aspirations, eventually winning the National title in 1985 and 1986. Following his national successes, he went on to compete in the Davis Cup representing Sri Lanka several times throughout the mid 1980s.

Later career
After immigrating to Sydney, Australia with his family, Frank became a full-time tennis coach leading a tennis academy in Sydney's north west. He continues to play competitive tennis in the International Tennis Federation's Senior League with the highest Singles ranking of 49 and highest Doubles ranking of 5.

Legacy
During the zenith of his career, Frank Sebaratnam was a household name in Sri Lanka and held several endorsements with sporting goods companies. To this day, his legacy is referenced when Sri Lankan tennis is discussed.

References

1954 births
Living people
Sri Lankan sportsmen
Sri Lankan sports coaches
People from Jaffna
Sri Lankan Tamil sportspeople
Sri Lankan male tennis players
Australian people of Sri Lankan Tamil descent